Ben Betts (born August 5, 1968) is an assistant men's basketball coach at Winthrop University.  He has previously held the head coaching position at South Carolina State University.

External links
SoonerSports - Ben Betts Bio

1968 births
Living people
Basketball coaches from Virginia
Basketball players from Virginia
College of Charleston Cougars men's basketball coaches
Purdue Fort Wayne Mastodons men's basketball coaches
Georgia Southern Eagles men's basketball coaches
Oklahoma Sooners men's basketball coaches
Sportspeople from Lynchburg, Virginia
South Carolina State Bulldogs basketball coaches
Tennessee State Tigers basketball coaches
VCU Rams men's basketball coaches
Guards (basketball)